The Minister for Science was a minister in the New South Wales Government, however the initial responsibilities of the portfolio are unclear and it was held in addition to that of education. Science and medical research was a portfolio from 2003 until 2011, when it was retitled medical research.

Science returned to the portfolio level in December 2021 as part of the responsibilities of the Minister for Science, Innovation and Technology, Alister Henskens.

List of ministers
The following individuals have served as Minister where Science was one of the responsibilities in the portfolio:

See also 

List of New South Wales government agencies

References

Science